Western Syrmia may refer to:

 in geography, western parts of the region of Syrmia
 in early modern history, western parts of the Syrmia County
 during the Ottoman rule, western parts of the Sanjak of Syrmia
 in modern history, western parts of the Syrmia Oblast
 southeastern part of the Eastern Slavonia, Baranja and Western Syrmia (disambiguation) entity
 in administration, colloquial term for the Vukovar-Syrmia County in Croatia

See also
 Syrmia (disambiguation)
 Eastern Syrmia (disambiguation)

Regions of Croatia
Syrmia